The fourth series of the British medical drama television series Casualty commenced airing in the United Kingdom on BBC One on 8 September 1989 and finished on 1 December 1989.

Cast

The fourth series of Casualty features a cast of characters working in the emergency department of Holby City Hospital. Derek Thompson continues his role as charge nurse Charlie Fairhead, while Brenda Fricker plays state enrolled nurse Megan Roach. Cathy Shipton stars as sister Lisa "Duffy" Duffin, and Eddie Nestor appears as staff nurse Cyril James. Geoffrey Leesley portrays paramedic Keith Cotterill, and Susan Franklyn appears as administrator Valerie Sinclair.

Robson Green was cast as Geordie hospital porter Jimmy Powell following the decision to delocalise the show's setting. Three actors were cast in single-series regular roles. Tam Hoskyns joined the cast as senior house officer Lucy Perry, who was billed as "all books and brains but no practice and compassion". Alex Spencer, portrayed by Belinda Davidson, was introduced as a middle-class student nurse, and Julie Stevens, played by Vivienne McKone, appeared as the overcompensating receptionist.

Episode one also marked the first appearance of paramedic Josh Griffiths, portrayed by Ian Bleasdale. The actor had been hired by director Andrew Morgan in a guest role for a couple of episodes and would later join the regular cast in future series. William Gaminara appeared in four episodes as registrar Andrew Bower, who became a love interest for Duffy. He departed after writers decided to create tragedy for the character of Duffy. At the conclusion of the series, Nestor and Franklyn left their roles as Cyril and Valerie, respectively.

Main characters 

Ian Bleasdale as Josh Griffiths (from episode 1)
Belinda Davidson as Alex Spencer (episodes 1−12)
Susan Franklyn as Valerie Sinclair (until episode 12)
Brenda Fricker as Megan Roach
William Gaminara as Andrew Bower (episodes 1−4)
Robson Green as Jimmy Powell (from episode 1)
Tam Hoskyns as Lucy Perry (episodes 1−12)
Geoffrey Leesley as Keith Cotterill
Vivienne McKone as Julie Stevens (episodes 1−12)
Eddie Nestor as Cyril James (until episode 12)
Cathy Shipton as Lisa "Duffy" Duffin
Derek Thompson as Charlie Fairhead

Production 
Peter Norris serves as the producer of series four, replacing original producer Geraint Morris, who left to produce The Bill. He was hired by Jonathan Powell, the head of drama at the BBC, following his work on The Rainbow. Norris admitted that he jumped at the chance to produce Casualty. He then hired a casting director and worked with script editor Susan Gander to create new characters. Casualty is based in the fictional city of Holby, which was originally localised to Bristol, where the drama is filmed. Norris wanted to change this and removed the show's obvious Bristolian mannerisms. One of these included Duffy's West Country accent, which was dropped suddenly, as well as the introduction of Geordie character Jimmy Powell.

The drama was moved to a post-watershed Friday night time slot from a Saturday night time slot for this series. Shipton explained that producers wanted to create an "urban feel" to the show by moving it to a later time slot. Norris wanted to use this opportunity to portray "tougher" stories, so he hired writers who wanted to tell stories about special issues and gave them the freedom to do so. While the first three series of Casualty explored the political side of the NHS, Norris wanted series four to explore social issues which were not portrayed in the media. The change in time slot and difference in stories proved successful and ratings grew to over 13 million viewers.

The series opens with a road accident, described as "spectacular" by Hilary Kingsley, the author of Casualty: The Inside Story. The stunt features the most vehicles the show had included to date and used drums of hydrofluoric acid. During filming, one of the drums was pushed too fast, causing it to head towards the camera crew. Norris confessed that he was completing paperwork about the incident for a year afterwards. The series finale features a terrorist attack at a department store. Norris described the making of the episode "a lark" and compared the set to Gone with the Wind with the blood stains on-set. The episode was scheduled for the same week as a remembrance service for the victims of the 1987 Remembrance Day bombing, which concerned the production team. However, there was no complaints, which Norris accredited to Morris previously defending other series of the drama.

Episodes

References

Bibliography

External links
 Casualty series 4 at the Internet Movie Database

04
1989 British television seasons